This is a list of equipment used by the Tunisian Army.

Current equipment

Small arms

Artillery

Anti-tank weapons

Anti-aircraft weapons

Tanks

Reconnaissance

Armored vehicles

Logistic vehicles
HET M1000 (United States)
M151A2 MUTT 4×4 (United States)
Land Rover Defender 4×4 (United Kingdom)
Mercedes-Benz Unimog U-4000 (Germany)
Mercedes-Benz Unimog U-5000 (Germany)
M35A2 cargo truck (United States)
M939 cargo truck (United States)
56 M49 tanker truck (United States)

Radar
 2 RASIT DRPT ground surveillance radar (France)
 2 AN/TPQ-53 (United States) on order
 4-6 Giraffe 40 (Sweden)

Former equipment

Artillery
30 Mle 1950 BF-50 155mm towed howitzer (France), delivered on 1960
30 M114A1 155mm towed howitzer (United States), ex-US, delivered on 1965
48 M108 105mm self-propelled howitzer (United States),ex-US, delivered on 1968

Anti-tank equipment
80 SS.11 ATGM launcher (France)
300 M20 "Super Bazooka" 3.7 inch/94mm Light ATRL (United States)
140 M18 57mm recoilless rifle (United States)

Anti-aircraft equipment
16 M42 Duster twin-mounted Bofors 40 mm self-propelled AAG (United States/Sweden) 8 delivered on 1968 and 8 delivered on 1972, all second hand; aid

Tanks
30 AMX-13/75 75mm main gun light tank (France), 15 delivered on 1960 and 15 delivered on 1970
12 M41 Walker Bulldog 76mm main gun light tank (United States), delivered on 1960, second hand
14 M48A5 Patton 90mm main gun main battle tank (United States), delivered on 1973, second hand

Armoured vehicles
15 EBR-75 armoured car (France), delivered on 1957
10 M8 Greyhound armoured car (United States), delivered on 1960

Reconnaissance
20 Alvis Saladin 76mm main gun 6×6 ARV (United Kingdom)

Planned equipment
 Altay - Tunisia wants to modernize its current fleet of main battle tanks and replace its American m-60s and the roadmap signed with Turkey together with its very high performance may be the best option.
 TGR-300 Kasirga - the Tunisian army is in the process of renewing its armed forces and, as it has rocket launcher artillery systems, Turkey has offered the TGR-300 Kasirga.

References 

Military equipment of Tunisia
Tunisian Army